The Universal Referral Program (URP) is a system intended to facilitate completion of training for open water recreational scuba diving students who intend to do their training dives at a place different from the venue for the theory and confined water training. More specifically, it allows inter agency referral - the referral instructor is not necessarily a member of the same certification agency as the initiating instructor.

The program was developed in 1998 by educators, risk managers and attorneys for the diver certification agencies International Diving Educators Association (IDEA), National Association of Scuba Diving Schools (NASDS), National Association of Underwater Instructors (NAUI), Professional Diving Instructors Corporation (PDIC), Scuba Schools International (SSI) and YMCA SCUBA Program based on industry training standards. The system established referral paperwork, procedures and a minimum list of  skills to be performed. The URP enrollment procedures and instructor qualifications are managed by each training agency for their members. The referral instructor must review and verify that the candidate's medical history form has been completed, conduct the required open water skills exercises, and assess the diver on the specified diving skills, then complete the paperwork. If performance was satisfactory a temporary certification may be issued. The completed form is returned to the initiating instructor to issue the certification.

PADI instructors can also accept students for certification dives using the Universal Referral Program form.

The advantages of the URP are that the learner diver can complete the theory and confined water training near home, which should be more economical in time and cost, then get the open water training in a vacation environment, where the water conditions are likely to be more pleasant, and can be followed by further recreational dives. The hometown study environment is found to be more conducive to learning than the vacation environment, and referral students tend to have a better grasp of the theoretical side of the training. Completing the theory and pool training at the local dive shop saves on vacation time and allows the learner more time to practice and develop skills as the time pressure is reduced. They also have the opportunity to become involved in the local diving community.

Disadvantages of the Referral Program are that there may be a delay between the initial part of the course and the open water dives. The time allowed varies from 6 months to a year, depending on the certification agency, and this is long enough to forget some skills and knowledge, so a refresher may be required. It is preferable to do both parts within a short period, and this may be logistically complicated, and the weather conditions may not be conducive to this schedule. The change between instructors may not be helpful, as they may differ in style and personality, and there may be small differences in technique which could cause confusion, but could also provide a better range of experience. It is also likely that rented equipment will be unfamiliar at the referral site. An unfamiliar set of equipment should be tested in benign conditions where adjustments can be made in comfort and safety, which requires more time. There may also be an increased cost because of the split between two service providers, the additional paperwork and other overheads and sometimes the necessity to repeat training of forgotten skills.

References

Underwater diver training